Germania is a census-designated place (CDP) in Atlantic County, New Jersey, United States. It is in the east-central part of the county, in western Galloway Township. U.S. Route 30 touches the southern border of Germania, leading northwest through Egg Harbor City  to Hammonton and southeast  to Atlantic City.

Clarks Mill Stream, a northeast-flowing tributary of Nacote Creek and thence the tidal Mullica River, forms the southeastern border of the Germania CDP.
 
Germania was first listed as a CDP prior to the 2020 census.

Demographics

References 

Census-designated places in Atlantic County, New Jersey
Census-designated places in New Jersey
Galloway Township, New Jersey